United Nations Security Council Resolution 335, adopted unanimously on June 22, 1973, after separately considering their applications, the Council recommended to the General Assembly that both the German Democratic Republic and the Federal Republic of Germany be simultaneously admitted.

See also
 List of United Nations Security Council Resolutions 301 to 400 (1971–1976)

References 
Text of the Resolution at undocs.org

External links
 

 0335
1973 in East Germany
1973 in West Germany
Germany and the United Nations
Foreign relations of East Germany
Foreign relations of West Germany
 0335
June 1973 events
East Germany–West Germany relations
 0335